In topology, a formal ball is an extension of the notion of ball to allow unbounded and negative radius.  The concept of formal ball was introduced by Weihrauch and Schreiber in 1981 and the negative radius case (the generalized formal ball) by Tsuiki and Hattori in 2008.

Formal balls possess a partial order  defined by  if , identical to that defined by set inclusion.

Formal balls possess the Lawson topology and the Martin topology.

References

K. Weihrauch and U. Schreiber 1981.  "Embedding metric spaces into CPOs".  Theoretical computer science, 16:5-24.

H. Tsuiki and Y. Hattori 2008.  "Lawson topology of the space of formal balls and the hyperbolic topology of a metric space".  Theoretical computer science, 405:198-205

Y. Hattori 2010.  "Order and topological structures of posets of the formal balls on metric spaces".  Memoirs of the Faculty of Science and Engineering. Shimane University. Series B 43:13-26

Topology